Are We There Yet? may refer to:

Film and television 
 Are We There Yet? (film), a 2005 American/Canadian family comedy film
 Are We There Yet? (TV series), an American sitcom based on the film
 Are We There Yet?: World Adventure, a 2007–2009 Canadian children's travel television series
 "Are We There Yet" (Barney & Friends), an episode of Barney and Friends
 Are We There Yet, an episode of Jay Jay the Jet Plane
 "Are We There Yet?" (Yes, Dear), an episode of Yes, Dear

Other media 
 Are We There Yet? (Carla Bley album), 1999
 Are We There Yet? (John Reuben album), 2000
 Are We There Yet? (video game), a 1991 MS-DOS game
 Are We There Yet? A Journey Around Australia, a picture book by Alison Lester
 Are We There Yet? (novel), a novel by David Levithan
Are We There Yet?, a YouTube series featuring Robby Novak and Brad Montague
Are We There Yet? (book), a children's book by Alison Lester

See also
 Dwight Barkley (born 1959), mathematician who developed a formula for estimating how long it will take for a child in a car to ask this question
 Are We Nearly There Yet?, a 2007 album by Television Personalities